IMG Academy Bradenton  is an American soccer team based in Bradenton, Florida, United States. Founded in 1998, the team plays in USL League Two, the fourth tier of the American Soccer Pyramid.

The team is associated with IMG Academy and the United States Soccer Federation's full-time residency program for the US Under 17 Men's National Team. The team plays its home games in the stadium at IMG Academy, where they have played since 2003. The team's colors are blue, gold and black.

From 2004 to 2008 the team had a sister organization, the Bradenton Athletics, who played in the women's W-League.

Players

Current roster
As of June 23, 2014.

Notable former players
This list of notable former players comprises players who went on to play professional soccer after playing for the team in the Premier Development League, or those who previously played professionally before joining the team.

  David Abidor
  Anthony Ampaipitakwong
  Bernardo Anor
  Jeff Attinella
  Zak Boggs
  Kevin Burns
  Jonny Campbell
  Francis de Vries
  Ben Everson
  Jani Galik
  Blair Gavin
  Michael Gavin
  Miguel Gonzalez
  Happy Hall
  Cameron Hepple
  Stephen Keel
  Wes Knight
  Nick Kolarac
  David Mahoney
  Devon McKenney
  Pascal Millien
  Steven Morris
  Kurt Morsink
  Nick Noble
  Michael Parkhurst
  Heath Pearce
  Charlie Reiter
  Brad Rusin
  Jordan Seabrook
  Yevgeni Starikov
  Ryan Thompson
  Tanner Wolfe
  Andrew Wolverton
  Leland Wright

Year-by-year

Honors
 USL PDL Southern Conference Champions 2009
 USL PDL Southeast Division Champions 2006
 USL PDL Southern Conference Champions 2002

Head coaches
  Tom Durkin (2005–2011)

Stadia
 IMG Soccer Academy; Bradenton, Florida (2003–present)

Average attendance
Attendance stats are calculated by averaging each team's self-reported home attendances from the historical match archive at https://web.archive.org/web/20100105175057/http://www.uslsoccer.com/history/index_E.html.

 2005: 97
 2006: 103
 2007: 135
 2008: 138
 2009: 133
 2010: 133

References

External links
Official Site

Association football clubs established in 1998
Soccer clubs in Florida
USL League Two teams
1998 establishments in Florida
IMG Academy